Charles d'Agar (1669–1723) was a French portrait painter, the son of Jacques d'Agar. Active in England for much of his life, he is most known for portraits made during the Late Stuart and Early Georgian eras.

D'Agar came to England with his father in 1681. He primarily painted portraits on commission for patrons such as the Duke of Buccleuch and Lord Bolingbroke. Some of his works can be found at Nunnington Hall.

Notes

References

Further reading
Contemporary accounts
 
 
Scholarly notes
 
 
 
 
 
 
Reference books
 
 
 
 
 
 
 

17th-century French painters
French male painters
18th-century French painters
1669 births
1723 deaths
18th-century French male artists